The 2008 NCAA Division I men's ice hockey tournament involved 16 schools playing in single-elimination play to determine the national champion of men's NCAA Division I college ice hockey. The tournament began on March 28, 2008, and ended with the championship game on April 12.

Boston College, coached by Jerry York, won its third national title with a 4–1 victory in the championship game over Notre Dame, coached by Jeff Jackson.

Nathan Gerbe, junior forward for Boston College, scored five goals in the final two games and was named the Frozen Four Most Outstanding Player.

This was the first tournament in 47 years to have two teams from the same conference play in the opening round. This occurred due to the glut of WCHA teams that received 2nd- and 3rd-seeds in the regional divisions.

Tournament procedure

The NCAA Men's Division I Ice Hockey Championship is a single-elimination tournament featuring 16 teams representing all six Division I conferences in the nation.  The Championship Committee seeds the entire field from 1 to 16 within four regionals of 4 teams.  The winners of the six Division I conference championships receive automatic bids to participate in the NCAA Championship.

In setting up the tournament, the Championship Committee seeks to ensure "competitive equity, financial success and likelihood of playoff-type atmosphere at each regional site."  A team serving as the host of a regional is placed within that regional. The top four teams are assigned overall seeds and placed within the bracket such that the national semifinals will feature the No. 1 seed versus the No. 4 seed and the No. 2 seed versus the No. 3 seed should the top four teams win their respective regional finals.  Number 1 seeds are also placed as close to their home site as possible, with the No. 1 seed receiving first preference.  Conference matchups are avoided in the first round; should five or more teams from one conference make the tournament, this guideline may be disregarded in favor of preserving the bracket's integrity.

The four regionals are officially named after their geographic areas.  The following were the sites for the 2008 regionals:
March 28 and 29
East Regional, Times Union Center - Albany, New York (Hosts: ECAC Hockey and Rensselaer Polytechnic Institute)
West Regional, Broadmoor World Arena - Colorado Springs, Colorado (Hosts: Colorado College and the Colorado Springs Sports Commission)

March 29 and 30
Midwest Regional, Kohl Center - Madison, Wisconsin (Host: University of Wisconsin–Madison)
Northeast Regional, DCU Center - Worcester, Massachusetts (Host: College of the Holy Cross)

Each regional winner advanced to the Frozen Four:
April 10 and 12
Pepsi Center - Denver, Colorado (Hosts: University of Denver and the Metro Denver Sports Commission)

Qualifying teams
The at-large bids, along with the seeding for each team in the tournament, were announced on Sunday, March 23. Six teams from the WCHA qualified for the tournament, a record for the number of teams from one conference.

Brackets
The number in parentheses denotes overall seed in the tournament.

East Regional – Albany, New York

West Regional – Colorado Springs, Colorado

Northeast Regional – Worcester, Massachusetts

Midwest Regional – Madison, Wisconsin

Frozen Four – Pepsi Center, Denver, Colorado

(*) denotes overtime period(s).

Results

East Region – Albany, New York

Regional semifinal

Regional Final

Northeast Region – Worcester, Massachusetts

Regional semifinal

Regional Final

Midwest Region – Madison, Wisconsin

Regional semifinal

Regional Final

West Region – Colorado Springs, Colorado

Regional semifinal

Regional Final

Frozen Four – Denver, Colorado

Semifinal

National Championship – Denver, Colorado

Record by conference

All-Tournament team

Frozen Four
 G: John Muse (Boston College)
 D: Michael Brennan (Boston College)
 D: Kyle Lawson (Notre Dame)
 F: Kevin Deeth (Notre Dame)
 F: Nathan Gerbe* (Boston College)
 F: Ben Smith (Boston College)
* Most Outstanding Player(s)

References
General
 
Specific

Tournament
NCAA Division I men's ice hockey tournament
NCAA Division I men's ice hockey tournament
NCAA Division I men's ice hockey tournament
NCAA Division I men's ice hockey tournament
NCAA Division I men's ice hockey tournament
NCAA Division I men's ice hockey tournament
NCAA Division I men's ice hockey tournament
2000s in Denver
2000s in Colorado Springs, Colorado
History of Madison, Wisconsin
Ice hockey in Worcester, Massachusetts
Ice hockey in Wisconsin
Ice hockey competitions in Colorado Springs, Colorado
Ice hockey competitions in Denver
Ice hockey competitions in Worcester, Massachusetts
Ice hockey competitions in Albany, New York
Ice hockey competitions in Wisconsin
Sports in Madison, Wisconsin